Mountain Park is an unincorporated community located in the Bryan Township of western  Surry County, North Carolina. The community's unique name is derived from its "mountain location in a park-like setting."  Notable old-time musician and luthier Johnny Gentry is from Mountain Park.

Geography
The center of the community is the intersection of Mountain Park Road and Zephyr-Mountain Park Road.  Located at the intersection is the former community post office, Mountain Park Baptist Church, Mountain Park Elementary School, and former community store.

Mountain Park is located at  (36.374, -80.855).

References

Unincorporated communities in Surry County, North Carolina
Unincorporated communities in North Carolina